Daniel Garvey is an American academic and administrator. He is the former president of Prescott College in Arizona. Prior to becoming president of Prescott College, Garvey was a professor at the University of New Hampshire.

He works at Prescott College's Institute for Sustainable Social Change.

Education 
Garvey has a bachelor's degree from Worcester State College, a master's degree from Goddard College, and a Ph.D. from the University of Colorado.

References
Arizona Republic March 30, 2010 interview with Garvey

American educational theorists
Goddard College alumni
University of Colorado alumni
University of New Hampshire faculty
Heads of universities and colleges in the United States
Living people
Year of birth missing (living people)
Worcester State University alumni